Greenbrier High School may refer to:

 Greenbrier High School (Arkansas) - Greenbrier, Arkansas
 Greenbrier High School (Georgia) - Evans, Georgia
 Greenbrier High School (Tennessee) - Greenbrier, Tennessee
 Greenbrier East High School - Fairlea, West Virginia
 Greenbrier West High School - Charmco, West Virginia